Uwe Wegmann (born 14 January 1964) is a German football coach and a retired player.

His 22 goals in the 1993–94 season in the 2. Bundesliga made him the league's topscorer and helped to secure VfL Bochum's direct return the German top flight.

Career statistics

Honours
1. FC Kaiserslautern
 DFB-Pokal: 1995–96

Individual
 2. Bundesliga top scorer: 1993–94 (22 goals)

References

External links
 

1964 births
Living people
People from Oberallgäu
Sportspeople from Swabia (Bavaria)
Footballers from Bavaria
German footballers
Association football midfielders
Association football forwards
VfL Bochum players
Rot-Weiss Essen players
1. FC Kaiserslautern players
FC Lugano players
FC Vaduz players
Bundesliga players
2. Bundesliga players
Swiss Super League players
Swiss Challenge League players
German football managers
FC Vaduz managers
USV Eschen/Mauren managers
German expatriate footballers
German expatriate sportspeople in Switzerland
Expatriate footballers in Switzerland
German expatriate sportspeople in Liechtenstein
Expatriate footballers in Liechtenstein
West German footballers